The Shenandoah Red Jackets were an Eastern League of Professional Football team based in Shenandoah, Pennsylvania, United States that played during the league's only year of existence, 1926. They went 2-5-1 (two wins, five losses and one tie), finishing seventh in the league.

References

American football teams established in 1926
Defunct American football teams in Pennsylvania
1926 establishments in Pennsylvania
Schuylkill County, Pennsylvania